Haim Ariav (born Haim Krupski: 1895 – 16 June 1957) was an Israeli politician who served as a member of the Knesset for the General Zionists between 1951 and 1957.

Biography
Born in Lida, in the Vilna Governorate of the Russian Empire (present-day Grodno Region, Belarus), Ariav was educated in a heder and a Russian primary school. He made aliyah to Ottoman-controlled Palestine in 1912 and finished his secondary education at the Herzliya Hebrew High School. He went on to study jurisprudence at the Jerusalem Jurisprudence School, and was certified as a lawyer.

He volunteered for the Ottoman Army, and attended officers training school in Istanbul. He later taught at a military school in Damascus and worked as a translator. After the Nili group was discovered, Ariav was arrested and sent to Istanbul, though he was later released and sent to the Caucasus front to be an officer and translator.

After the war he worked in the secretariat of the Delegates Committee, and became its general secretary. In 1929, he was appointed general secretary of the Jerusalem branch of the Jewish Agency, where he worked until 1931. A secretary of the Hitahdut HaIkarim, in 1934 he founded the Society for Local Councils. He was also amongst the founders and directors of the HaBoker newspaper.

A member of the executive committee of the Union of General Zionists, Ariav was elected to the Knesset in 1951 on the General Zionists' list. He was re-elected in 1955, and died in 1957 whilst still serving as an MK. His seat was taken by Ya'akov Klivnov.

References

External links
 

1895 births
1957 deaths
People from Lida
People from Lidsky Uyezd
Belarusian Jews
Jews from the Russian Empire
Emigrants from the Russian Empire to the Ottoman Empire
Ashkenazi Jews in Ottoman Palestine
Ashkenazi Jews in Mandatory Palestine
Israeli people of Belarusian-Jewish descent
General Zionists politicians
People of the Jewish Agency for Israel
Herzliya Hebrew Gymnasium alumni
Ottoman military personnel of World War I
Members of the 2nd Knesset (1951–1955)
Members of the 3rd Knesset (1955–1959)